Controller is a simulation video game published in 1982 for the Apple II and Atari 8-bit computers by The Avalon Hill Game Company and developed by its division Microcomputer Games.

Gameplay
Controller is a game in which the player is an air traffic controller.

Reception
Bill Willett reviewed the game for Computer Gaming World, and stated that "I would recommend Controller to those who would like a "thinking" game that doesn't let you dawdle around moving planes like chessmen. The arcade player, however, may be disappointed with the slow (real time) action of the game."

References

External links

Addison Wesley Book of Atari Software 1984

1982 video games
Air traffic control simulators
Apple II games
Atari 8-bit family games
Avalon Hill video games
Video games developed in the United States